Azochis essequibalis is a moth in the family Crambidae. It is found in Guyana.

References

Moths described in 1924
Spilomelinae
Moths of South America